This is a list of Spanish football transfers for the summer sale prior to the 2018–19 season of La Liga and Segunda División. Only moves from La Liga and Segunda División are listed.

The summer transfer window began on 1 July 2018, although a few transfers took place prior to that date. The window closed at midnight on 1 September 2018. Players without a club can join one at any time, either during or in between transfer windows. Clubs below La Liga level can also sign players on loan at any time. If needed, clubs can sign a goalkeeper on an emergency loan, if all others are unavailable.

La Liga

Alavés 
Manager:  Abelardo Fernández (2nd season)

In

Out

Athletic Bilbao 
Manager:  Eduardo Berizzo (1st season)

In

Out

Atlético Madrid 
Manager:  Diego Simeone (8th season)

In

Out

Barcelona 
Manager:  Ernesto Valverde (2nd season)

In

Out

Celta Vigo 
Manager:  Antonio Mohamed (1st season)

In

Out

Eibar 
Manager:  José Luis Mendilibar (4th season)

In

Out

Espanyol 
Manager:  Rubi (1st season)

In

Out

Getafe 
Manager:  José Bordalás (3rd season)

In

Out

Girona 
Manager:  Eusebio Sacristán (1st season)

In

Out

Huesca 
Manager:  Leo Franco (1st season)

In

Out

Leganés 
Manager:  Mauricio Pellegrino (1st season)

In

Out

Levante 
Manager:  Paco López (2nd season)

In

Out

Rayo Vallecano 
Manager:  Míchel (3rd season)

In

Out

Real Betis 
Manager:  Quique Setién (2nd season)

In

Out

Real Madrid 
Manager:  Julen Lopetegui (1st season)

In

Out

Real Sociedad 
Manager:  Asier Garitano (1st season)

In

Out

Sevilla 
Manager:  Pablo Machín (1st season)

In

Out

Valencia 
Manager:  Marcelino (2nd season)

In

Out

Valladolid 
Manager:  Sergio González (2nd season)

In

Out

Villarreal 
Manager:  Javier Calleja (2nd season)

In

Out

Segunda División

Albacete 
Manager:  Luis Miguel Ramis (1st season)

In

Out

Alcorcón 
Manager:  Cristóbal Parralo (1st season)

In

Out

Almería 
Manager:  Fran Fernández (2nd season)

In

Out

Cádiz 
Manager:  Álvaro Cervera (4th season)

In

Out

Córdoba 
Manager:  José Ramón Sandoval (1st season)

In

Out

Deportivo La Coruña 
Manager:  Natxo González (1st season)

In

Out

Elche 
Manager:  Pacheta (2nd season)

In

Out

Extremadura 
Manager:  Juan Sabas (2nd season)

In

Out

Gimnàstic 
Manager:  José Antonio Gordillo (2nd season)

In

Out

Granada 
Manager:  Diego Martínez (1st season)

In

Out

Las Palmas 
Manager:  Manuel Jiménez (1st season)

In

Out

Lugo 
Manager:  Javi López (1st season)

In

Out

Málaga 
Manager:  Juan Muñiz (1st season)

In

Out

Mallorca 
Manager:  Vicente Moreno (2nd season)

In

Out

Numancia 
Manager:  Aritz López Garai (1st season)

In

Out

Osasuna 
Manager:  Jagoba Arrasate (1st season)

In

Out

Oviedo 
Manager:  Juan Antonio Anquela (2nd season)

In

Out

Rayo Majadahonda 
Manager:  Antonio Iriondo (7th season)

In

Out

Reus 
Manager:  Xavi Bartolo (1st season)

In

Out

Sporting Gijón 
Manager:  Rubén Baraja (2nd season)

In

Out

Tenerife 
Manager:  Joseba Etxeberria (2nd season)

In

Out

Zaragoza 
Manager:  Imanol Idiakez (1st season)

In

Out

References

Transfers
Spain
2018